William McMaster may refer to:

 William Alexander McMaster (1879 - 1961), Canadian parliamentarian and lawyer
 William H. McMaster (1877 – 1968), tenth Governor of South Dakota
 William McMaster (1811 – 1887), Canadian wholesaler, Senator and banker
 William McMaster (businessman) (1851 - 1930), Canadian businessman
 William McMaster Murdoch (1873 – 1912), Scottish sailor who served as First Officer aboard the RMS Titanic